The Vincent Buckley Poetry Prize is a biennial award that is offered alternately to enable an Australian poet to visit Ireland and to facilitate the visit of an Irish poet to Melbourne. It provides the recipient with a return airfare, a contribution towards living expenses and an honorary fellowship at the Australian Centre in the School of Historical and Philosophical Studies at the University of Melbourne.

The prize was established in 1992 to commemorate the life and work of Vincent Buckley by reflecting his "love of and commitment to both Australian and Irish poetry".  Buckley was a poet, critic and Professor of English at the University of Melbourne and the prize was funded through donations from his family and friends.

The Award
The award is made by a committee comprising the director of the Australian Centre, the head of the department of English at the University or the head's nominee, and a practising poet nominated by the dean of the faculty of Arts. Past committee members have included Chris Wallace-Crabbe and former recipient Cate Kennedy.

The first award was made in 1994 and the recipient was Lisa Gorton.

Winners
2020: Susannah Dickey
2018: Joel Deane
2016: James Harpur
2014: Dan Disney
2012: Miriam Gamble
2010: Elizabeth Campbell
2008: David Wheatley
2006: Bronwyn Lea
2004: Mark Granier
2002: Cate Kennedy
2000: John Montague
1998: Aileen Kelly
1996: Enda Wyley
1994: Lisa Gorton

References

Australian poetry awards
Awards established in 1992